Ramez Mohamed Galal Ahmed Tawufik (born 20 April 1973) is an Egyptian prankster, actor and singer. He graduated from the Egyptian Academy of Arts.

Biography
Ramez Galal is the son of the theater director Galal Tawfik and the younger brother of Yasser Galal. He studied at Kasr Al Tefl primary school and then moved to El Orman preparatory school. His secondary school was El Giza. After graduating, Galal decided to join the institute for dramatic arts, the acting and directing section. Galal entered military service after graduating, then returned to acting. In his early career, he got the chance to act alongside the prominent actor Salah Zulfikar in the 1993 TV special "Al-Rajul Al-Tayeb". In 2014 he appeared in a TV advertisement for Zain.

Television
In his prank show episodes, which are aired during Ramadan, Galal's guests are seen in fear for their lives. He has pranked famous Egyptian people and international stars like Paris Hilton, Steven Seagal, and Shah Rukh Khan. The reaction by Shah Rukh Khan during the punked show, was the fourth most trending YouTube video during the first week of Ramadan 2017. Despite the wild popularity of his shows, Galal has met with criticism. A person speaking for animal rights complained that a lion was sedated for the show. Another critic said the "insults" that fly when his guests are punked ruin Egypt's reputation. In 2020, Zamalek president Mortada Mansour filed a lawsuit demanding that Ramez Magnoon Rasmy (Ramez is Officially Crazy) prank show be suspended.

Filmography

Interviews
In an interview discussing the 2017 Minya attack where 29 Christians, including children, on their way to a monastery in Minya were killed, Galal burst into tears describing his feelings about the tragedy.

References

External links
 
 
 Ramez Galal YouTube Channel

1973 births
Living people
Egyptian male film actors
Male actors from Cairo
Egyptian Sunni Muslims
Egyptian male television actors
Entertainers from Cairo